Cheragh Tappeh may refer to:
 Cheragh Tappeh-ye Olya
 Cheragh Tappeh-ye Sofla